Nehemiah 13 is the thirteenth (and the final) chapter of the Book of Nehemiah in the Old Testament of the Christian Bible, or the 23rd chapter of the book of Ezra-Nehemiah in the Hebrew Bible, which treats the book of Ezra and the book of Nehemiah as one book. Jewish tradition states that Ezra is the author of Ezra-Nehemiah as well as the Book of Chronicles, but modern scholars generally accept that a compiler from the 5th century BCE (the so-called "Chronicler") is the final author of these books. This chapter addresses a series of problems handled by Nehemiah himself, which had arisen during his temporary absence from the land, with some similar issues to those related in Ezra 9–10 and Nehemiah 10.

Text
The original text of this chapter is in  Hebrew language. This chapter is divided into 31 verses.

Textual witnesses
Some early manuscripts containing the text of this chapter in Hebrew are of the Masoretic Text, which includes Codex Leningradensis (1008).

There is also a translation into Koine Greek known as the Septuagint, made in the last few centuries BCE. Extant ancient manuscripts of the Septuagint version include Codex Vaticanus (B; B; 4th century), Codex Sinaiticus (S; BHK: S; 4th century), and Codex Alexandrinus (A; A; 5th century).

Purification (13:1–3)
The opening verses record the obedience of the people at that period of time to the words of the Mosaic law, that they took "immediate" response (verse 3); in this case, by removing all people of foreign descents ("mixed multitude").

Verse 1
On that day they read in the book of Moses in the audience of the people; and therein was found written, that the Ammonite and the Moabite should not come into the congregation of God for ever;
 Their failure to provide the Israelites the basic requirements of food and water
 The Moabite king Balak had hired Balaam to curse Israel (–), although God turned these curses into great blessings.

The reforms of Nehemiah (13:4–31)
After 12 years in Jerusalem, Nehemiah returned to the court of Artaxerxes (verse 6), but during his absence, various abuses sprang up which he had to handle emphatically as recorded in this section. The cause of the offences can be traced to the religious laxity in the community, especially with close relationship of the priests with Tobiah (verse 4) and the family alliance of a grandson of Eliashib, the high priest, with Sanballat the Horonite (verse 28). Nehemiah took drastic measures to eradicate the ill:
Tobiah's "household stuffs" were thrown out of the temple complex (verse 8), which foreshadows Jesus' action of temple clearance (ff). Tobiah's house within the temple apparently was a base of his operation (verses 4–5), by 'using a privileged position in the temple economy to pursue [an] advantageous business arrangement'.
The temple was cleansed of everything unholy (verse 9)
The Levites, who fled to their "fields" (as they were permitted to raise animals according to ), were restored to their positions with the arrangements to receive once again their dues for the service for God (verses 11–13)
Guards were placed on the gates to prevent violation of Sabbath rules by trading (verses 19, 22) and a threat was issues for those who attempted to break the rules (verse 21)
Harsh treatment was performed by Nehemiah on those who had married foreign women (verse 25).
The errant grandson of Eliashib was banished (verse 28).
Nehemiah also reestablished the previous good conditions in chapters 10 and 12 by putting people under oath once more (verse 25; cf. ) and set up provisions for the regular service of the Temple (verses 30–31; cf. ff, ff).

Verse 6
But during all this I was not in Jerusalem, for in the thirty-second year of Artaxerxes king of Babylon I had returned to the king. Then after certain days I obtained leave from the king,
"The thirty-second year of Artaxerxes" corresponds to 433 BC. Thus, Nehemiah was governor of Judah from 445 to 433 BC, then he stayed in Susa for an unknown period of time before returning to Jerusalem. The text does not specify in what capacity he returned, although it was with authorisation from the king: he probably continued to be the governor until 407 BC, when Bigvai became governor.

Verse 31
And for the wood offering, at times appointed, and for the firstfruits.
Remember me, O my God, for good.
"Remember me": Just as in verses 14, 22, Nehemiah cried out for God to watch over him, during his confrontation with the priests and Levites regarding the defilement of their holy status which made them disqualified to serve.

See also
Artaxerxes I
Jerusalem
Related Bible parts: Ezra 9, Ezra 10, Nehemiah 10, Nehemiah 12

Notes

References

Sources

Further reading
Blenkinsopp, Joseph, "Ezra-Nehemiah: A Commentary" (Eerdmans, 1988)
Blenkinsopp, Joseph, "Judaism, the first phase" (Eerdmans, 2009)
Coggins, R.J., "The Books of Ezra and Nehemiah" (Cambridge University Press, 1976)
Ecker, Ronald L., "Ezra and Nehemiah", Ecker's Biblical Web Pages, 2007.
Grabbe, L.L., "Ezra-Nehemiah" (Routledge, 1998)
Grabbe, L.L., "A history of the Jews and Judaism in the Second Temple Period, Volume 1" (T&T Clark, 2004)
Throntveit, Mark A. (1992) "Ezra-Nehemiah". John Knox Press

External links
 Jewish translations:
 Nechemiah - Nehemiah - Chapter 13 (Judaica Press) translation [with Rashi's commentary] at Chabad.org
 Christian translations:
 Online Bible at GospelHall.org (ESV, KJV, Darby, American Standard Version, Bible in Basic English)
 Book of Nehemiah Chapter 13. Bible Gateway

13
Phoenicians in the Hebrew Bible